Apalone is a genus of turtles in the family Trionychidae. Species of Apalone are native to North America.

Geographic range
Most Apalone species are restricted to the United States, though the range of the spiny softshell, A. spinifera, extends into southern Canada and northern Mexico.

Taxonomy
Apalone is a fairly new classification, resurrected by Meylan in 1987, assigned to North American species of the genus Trionyx. They are still listed as Trionyx in some texts. (Trionyx now refers specifically to certain softshell species found mainly in Africa.)

Sexual dimorphism
Turtles of the genus Apalone exhibit marked sexual dimorphism. In carapace length, females grow to about twice the size of males. In males, the claws on the front feet are longer than those on the back feet, but in females, the claws on the back feet are longer. In males, the stout tail extends well beyond the posterior edge of the carapace, but in females, the relatively thinner tail barely reaches the edge of the carapace.

Behavior
Apalone turtles are fast swimmers that chase down their prey in water. They feed mainly on fish. They also like the comfort of sand as their bedding.

Species
The following three species are recognized as being valid.
Apalone ferox  – Florida softshell turtle - South Carolina, Georgia, Florida, and Alabama
Apalone mutica  – smooth softshell turtle - United States, east of the Rocky Mountains
Apalone spinifera  – spiny softshell turtle - Canada (southern Ontario and Quebec), most of the United States, and northeastern Mexico.

Nota bene: A binomial authority in parentheses indicates that the species was originally described in a genus other than Apalone.

References

Further reading
Rafinesque CS (1832). "Description of two new genera of Soft Shell Turtles of North America". Atlantic Journal and Friend of Knowledge 1: 64–65. (Apalone, new genus, p. 64).

External links

Tortoise.org Apalone entry
Spiny Softshell Turtle - Apalone spinifera Species account from the Iowa Reptile and Amphibian Field Guide

 
Turtle genera
Turtles of North America
Trionychinae
Taxa named by Constantine Samuel Rafinesque